This is a list of districts in the London Borough of Lambeth:

Angell Town
Brixton
Brixton Hill
Clapham
Clapham Park
Crystal Palace
Gipsy Hill
Herne Hill
Kennington
Lambeth
Loughborough Junction
Balham only 10%-20%, also in London Borough of Wandsworth
Oval and The Oval
Stockwell
Streatham
Streatham Hill
Tulse Hill
Vauxhall
Waterloo
West Dulwich
West Norwood

Lists of places in London